John Lindsay (1862–1932) was a Scottish footballer who played in the Football League for Accrington. He represented Scotland three times between 1888 and 1893.

Pre-1889
John Lindsay played, in goal, in all three Scottish Cup Finals played by Renton, his home club. He spent four years on Renton' books form 1885 - 1889 (Wikipedia article on Renton F.C.)

Season 18889-90
John Lindsay signed for Accrington in 1889 and played in all but one first team match throughout the season. 1889-90 was Accrington' best League season, finishing sixth. Accrington did well despite conceding 56 goals, the fourth worst in the League. John Lindsay failed to keep a clean sheet in any League match and his only clean sheet was a FA Cup Replay, won 3-0 at Thorneyholme Road, Accrington against  West Bromwich Albion
Lindsay stayed on Accrington' books for another two seasons but never played English first team football again, returning to Renton in 1892.

References

1862 births
1932 deaths
Scottish footballers
Accrington F.C. players
English Football League players
Renton F.C. players
St Bernard's F.C. players
Scotland international footballers
Association football goalkeepers
People from Renton, West Dunbartonshire
Date of birth missing
Date of death missing
Place of death missing
Footballers from West Dunbartonshire